Thirst for Blood, Hunger for Flesh is a compilation album by Abscess featuring tracks from various demos, EPs, splits, and singles. It was released by Necroharmonic Productions in 2003.

Track listing

  "Speed Freak"   – 1:27  
  "Leech Boy"  – 1:35  
  "Swimming in Blood"  – 2:14  
  "For Those I Hate"  – 1:41  
  "Suicide Pact"  – 3:55  
  "Beneath The Skin"  – 3:02  
  "29th Lobotomy"  – 1:47  
  "Wriggling Torsos"  – 0:36  
  "Lunatic Whore"  – 1:51  
  "Open Wound"  – 2:19  
  "Scattered Carnage"  – 0:58  
  "Die Pig Die"  – 2:39  
  "To Die Again"  – 4:39  
  "Throbbing Black Werebeast"  – 1:18  
  "Brain Destroyer"  – 2:31  
  "Doomsday inside My Head"  – 3:51  
  "Horny Hag"  – 1:18  
  "Leave the Skin"  – 1:01  
  "Flesh Candy"  – 4:18  
  "Fuckin Hell"  – 2:39  
  "Necro Slut"  – 1:28  
  "Maldoror"  – 4:26  
  "Sink, Drown, Die"  – 1:54  
  "Fuckface"  – 1:57  
  "Thirst for Blood, Hunger for Flesh"  – 2:53

References

Abscess (band) albums
2003 compilation albums